The 1988–89 Montreal Canadiens season was the club's 80th season of play. The Canadiens finished first in the Adams Division, as well as the Prince of Wales Conference, with a 53–18–9 record for 115 points. The team finished second overall in the league behind the Calgary Flames, who had 117 points. Montreal defeated the Hartford Whalers, Boston Bruins and Philadelphia Flyers in the playoffs before meeting the Flames in the Stanley Cup Finals. Calgary took the series 4–2, clinching the Cup in Game 6 on the Canadiens' vaunted home ice, the Montreal Forum. This marked the only time that a visiting team defeated them to win the Stanley Cup on Forum ice.

The Canadiens were coached by Pat Burns and captained by Bob Gainey.

Offseason

Regular season
 November 7, 1988 – The Canadiens traded RW John Kordic and a 6th-round choice (Michael Doers) to the Toronto Maple Leafs in exchange for RW Russ Courtnall.

For the third straight season, the Canadiens allowed the fewest goals in the NHL (218), were the least penalized team (326 short-handed situations) and allowed the fewest power-play goals (58).

Final standings

Schedule and results

Player statistics

Forwards
Note: GP = Games played; G = Goals; A = Assists; Pts = Points; PIM = Penalties in minutes

Defencemen
Note: GP = Games played; G = Goals; A = Assists; Pts = Points; PIM = Penalties in minutes

Goaltending
Note: GP = Games played; W = Wins; L = Losses; T = Ties; SO = Shutouts; GAA = Goals against average

Playoffs

Adams Division semi-finals
Hartford Whalers vs. Montreal Canadiens

Montreal wins best-of-seven series 4 games to 0.

Adams Division finals
Boston Bruins vs. Montreal Canadiens

Montreal wins best-of-seven series 4 games to 1.

Conference finals
Philadelphia Flyers vs. Montreal Canadiens

Montreal wins best-of-seven series 4 games to 2.

Stanley Cup finals
Montreal Canadiens vs. Calgary Flames

The Stanley Cup Finals was decided between the top two teams during the 1988–89 NHL regular season. Co-captain Lanny McDonald scored the second Flames goal in Game 6. This turned out to be the last goal in his Hockey Hall of Fame career because he retired during the following off-season. Doug Gilmour scored two goals in the third period, including the eventual game and Cup winner to cement the victory for the Flames.

Calgary wins best-of-seven series 4 games to 2.

Awards and records
  Prince of Wales Trophy
  Frank J. Selke Trophy: Guy Carbonneau
  Jack Adams Award: Pat Burns
  James Norris Memorial Trophy: Chris Chelios
  William M. Jennings Trophy: Patrick Roy/Brian Hayward
  Vezina Trophy: Patrick Roy
 Patrick Roy, goalie, NHL First All-Star Team
 Chris Chelios, defence, NHL First All-Star Team

Transactions

Draft picks

Farm teams

See also
 1988–89 NHL season

References
 Canadiens on Hockey Database
 Canadiens on NHL Reference

Montreal Canadiens seasons
Adams Division champion seasons
Montreal Canadiens season, 1988-89
Eastern Conference (NHL) championship seasons
Montreal
Mon